The United States national handball team is controlled by USA Team Handball. Due to disputes over funding, general lack of fiscal discipline, and accusations of incompetence, on February 14, 2006, the USOC revoked the governing duties of handball from the United States Team Handball Federation but has since selected USA Team Handball as the new United States National Governing Body.

Tournament record

Olympic Games
Since their first appearance in 1936, USA has participated in six Olympic Games.

World Championship
Since their first appearance in 1964, USA has participated in seven World Championships.

Pan American Championship
Since their first appearance in 1980, USA has participated in 14 Pan American Championships.

Pan American Games
Since their first appearance in 1987, USA has participated in six Pan American Games.

Nor.Ca. Championship

IHF Emerging Nations Championship
2019 – 5th place

Current squad
The squad for the 2023 World Men's Handball Championship.

Head coach: Robert Hedin

See also
Handball in the United States
United States women's national handball team

References

External links

IHF profile

Handball in the United States
Men's national handball teams
Handball